Polyamine-modulated factor 1-binding protein 1 is a protein that is encoded in humans by the PMFBP1 gene.

References

Further reading